Albert Graff was an American football coach. He served as the head coach at Wheaton College in Wheaton, Illinois for one season, in 1942, compiling a record of 5–3–1.

Head coaching record

References

Year of birth missing
Year of death missing
Wheaton Thunder football coaches